Moulmein–Kallang Group Representation Constituency was a defunct four-member Group Representation Constituency (GRC), comprising several city suburbs surrounding the Central Area of Singapore. It existed from 2011 to 2015.

The GRC was formed in the 2011 general election, and absorbed most parts of the Jalan Besar GRC and the Moulmein ward of Tanjong Pagar GRC. The GRC was dissolved in 2015 General Election, as it was reverted back to pre-2011 constituencies. Only the Jalan Besar constituency was dissolved and merged into Kampong Glam and Kreta Ayer-Kim Seng (Upper Boon Keng Road/Lorong 1 Geylang/Lorong 3 Geylang).

Moulmein–Kallang GRC were co-led by Minister of Communications and Information and Minister-in-charge of Muslim Affairs Yaacob Ibrahim, and Minister of Transport Lui Tuck Yew. These two abovementioned cabinet ministers were retired from politics by 2020, but only Mayor for Central Singapore CDC Denise Phua and Minister of Culture, Community and Youth and Second Minister of Law Edwin Tong do remain at Kampong Glam in Jalan Besar GRC and Joo Chiat in Marine Parade GRC respectively.

The ward saw a contest in the 2011 general election between the incumbent People's Action Party and from Workers' Party of Singapore. The National Solidarity Party had expressed interest in contesting the constituency, but dropped out to avoid a three-cornered fight. The PAP emerged victor with 44,828 votes or 58.56% of the total ballots for the electoral division. Incidentally, this was the highest vote percentage for the PAP in a Workers' Party-contested constituency.

Members of Parliament

Electoral map
 Moulmein - Moulmein Road, Ah Hood Road, Balestier Road, Cambridge Road, KK Hospital, Little India (Tekka part), Lornie Road, MacRitchie Reservoir, Mount Pleasant , Newton and Novena .
 Jalan Besar -  Jalan Besar (incl. King George's Avenue), Bendemeer Road, Boon Keng Road, Upper Boon Keng Road, Lorong 1 Geylang and Lorong 3 Geylang.
 Kampong Glam - Kampong Glam, Beach Road, Bras Basah, Bugis Street, City Hall, Clarke Quay, Crawford Road, Hong Lim Park/Complex, Marina Centre, Nicoll Highway, North Bridge Road, Rochor Centre, Selegie Road and Waterloo Street.
 Kolam Ayer - Geylang Bahru, Kallang Bahru, Sims Avenue, Sims Drive, Sims Place， Sims Vista and St George's Road.

In GE 2015, the Moulmein division was revised into four parts :
 Blocks 677 & 681-685 of the Perumal and Race Course Roads, Tessensohn Road and Blocks 51 - 54 of Kent Road moved to Jalan Besar GRC.
 Block 69 of Moulmein Road, Tan Tock Seng Hospital, Novena and Balestier areas moved to Bishan–Toa Payoh GRC.
 Adam Road (Eng Neo, Dunearn and Watten Estates) moved to Holland–Bukit Timah GRC.
 The remainder moved to Tanjong Pagar GRC and became Moulmein-Cairnhill, which absorbed the northern half of Tanglin-Cairnhill as well.

Candidates and results

Elections in 2010s

References
2011 General Election's result

Notes

Singaporean electoral divisions
Downtown Core (Singapore)
Kallang
Novena, Singapore
Rochor
Singapore River
Straits View